The 1987–88 Drexel Dragons men's basketball team represented Drexel University  during the 1987–88 NCAA Division I men's basketball season. The Dragons, led by 11th year head coach Eddie Burke, played their home games at the Daskalakis Athletic Center (with the exception of 3 home games that were played at the Palestra) and were members of the East Coast Conference (ECC).

The team finished the season 18–10, and finished in 2nd place in the ECC in the regular season.

Drexel won their game against Manhattan via forfeit when Manhattah Head Coach Bob Delle Bovi took his team off the court to protest the officiating with 8:09 left to play in the second half.  The recorded final score of 70–56 was the score at the time of the incident.

On January 6, 1988, John Rankin set the Drexel team record for most points in a single game, scoring 44 points against Rider.   Later in the season, Michael Anderson scored 43 and 42 points in games against Lehigh and Rider respectively, which were the second and third highest scoring single game records in team history.

Roster

Schedule

|-
!colspan=9 style="background:#F8B800; color:#002663;"| Regular season
|-

|-
!colspan=12 style="background:#FFC600; color:#07294D;"| ECC Tournament

Awards
Michael Anderson
ECC Player of the Year
ECC All-Conference First Team
United Press International All-American honorable mention
Sporting News All-American honorable mention
United States Basketball Writers All-District team
Frances Pomeroy Naismith Award runner-up
Preseason ECC All-Conference First Team

Tom Murphy
ECC All-Rookie Team
Lawrence Grassi Award (most improved player)

Todd Lehmann
Donald Shank Spirit & Dedication Award

Brian Raabe
Dragon "D" Award (team's top defensive player)

John Rankin
ECC All-Conference Second Team
"Sweep" Award (team leader in rebounds)

References

Drexel Dragons men's basketball seasons
Drexel
1987 in sports in Pennsylvania
1988 in sports in Pennsylvania